Tudela de Duero is a municipality located in the province of Valladolid, Castile and León, Spain. According to the 2015 census (INE), the municipality has a population of 8,683 inhabitants.

References

See also
Cuisine of the province of Valladolid

Municipalities in the Province of Valladolid